Semeling is a mukim in Kuala Muda District, Kedah, Malaysia.

References

Kuala Muda District
Mukims of Kedah